, also known as the , was a middle Heian-period waka poet and Japanese nobleman. He is designated as a member of the Thirty-six Poetry Immortals.

His great-granddaughter was Murasaki Shikibu, author of the well-known monogatari the Tale of Genji.

His father was Fujiwara no Toshimoto.

Poetry
Kanesuke's poems are included in several imperial poetry anthologies, including Kokin Wakashū and Gosen Wakashū. A personal poetry collection known as the Kanesuke-shū also remains. 

The Tale of Heike contains "an almost direct quotation" of his poem in the Gosenshū (no. 1102).  The passage goes, "...as clear as a father's understanding may be in all other matters, love blinds him when it comes to his own child."

One of his poems is included in the famous anthology Hyakunin Isshu:

See also
Tsutsumi Chūnagon Monogatari

References

External links
E-text of his poems in Japanese

877 births
933 deaths
Japanese poets
Fujiwara clan
Hyakunin Isshu poets